General Dynamics UK is a British subsidiary of the American defence and security corporation General Dynamics. Founded in London in 1962, the company has grown to include eight sites across the United Kingdom, including in Bristol, Chippenham, Hastings, Merthyr Tydfil, Oakdale and Rotherham. Specialising in armoured fighting vehicles, avionic systems and tactical communications, the company has produced the General Dynamics Ajax armoured fighting vehicle, the Ocelot light protected patrol vehicle and the Bowman communications system. It is one of the UK's leading defence companies and a key supplier to the UK Ministry of Defence.

History
The company was originally founded as Computing Devices, part of the General Dynamics Information Systems and Technology group, in 1962.

In 1997, General Dynamics acquired Computing Devices Ltd which had been based in Hastings, East Sussex, since 1974. The company was responsible for supplying avionics to the Tornado GR1, Harrier GR7, Nimrod MR2 and Eurofighter Typhoon. These were praised for their effectiveness during both the Falklands War and Gulf War. More recently, the company provided avionics for the AgustaWestland AW101 Mk3 and Mk4 and AgustaWestland AW159 Wildcat helicopters.

In 2001, Computing Devices Canada (CDC) won a £1.7 billion contract from the UK Ministry of Defence to deliver Bowman, a communications system for the British Armed Forces, beating competing bids from Thales and TRW. The work was carried out at a newly-opened UK headquarters in Oakdale, South Wales, and under the new name of General Dynamics UK Limited, having previously been known as CDC Systems UK Limited. The Bowman system was to equip some 20,000 vehicles, 149 naval vessels, 350 aircraft and 100,000 service personnel. It was successfully delivered from March 2004.

In 2010, General Dynamics UK was awarded a contract to supply the British Army with a family of armoured fighting vehicles to meet the requirements of its Future Rapid Effect System (FRES) programme. As prime contractor, the company's bid centered around the General Dynamics Ajax armoured fighting vehicle (previously known as Scout SV), a development of the ASCOD armoured fighting vehicle which was co-developed by another General Dynamics subsidiary, the Spanish-based Santa Bárbara Sistemas. A total of 589 vehicles were to be produced in six variants, including turreted Ajax armoured reconnaissance variants, Ares armoured personnel carrier variants, Athena command and control variants, Argus engineer reconnaissance variants, Atlas recovery variants and Apollo repair variants. Manufacturing and assembly of the first 100 vehicles took place in Spain using steel supplied from Sweden, something the British government argued was not a major loss for British industry as the work for the remaining 489 vehicles was to be carried out in the United Kingdom. Subsequently, in 2016, General Dynamics UK opened an assembly, integration and testing facility for Ajax at a former forklift truck factory in Merthyr Tydfil, Wales, where work on the remaining 489 vehicles was to take place. The first variant of the Ajax family, the Ares, was delivered to the British Army in July 2020.

In 2011, General Dynamics acquired Force Protection Inc and its UK-based subsidiary Force Protection Europe which had developed the Ocelot light protected vehicle, otherwise known as Foxhound in the British Army. General Dynamics UK subsequently oversaw the delivery of Foxhound to the British Army and continues marketing the product.

In 2016, the UK Ministry of Defence awarded an Assessment Phase contract for its Challenger 2 Life Extension Project (LEP) to Team Challenger 2, a consortium of companies lead by BAE Systems which included General Dynamics Land Systems - UK. The company's Merthyr Tydfil facility was to be used to bring the Challenger 2 up to Mark 2 standard.

In 2017, General Dynamics UK was awarded a £330 million contract to supply the UK Ministry of Defence with tactical communication and information systems as part of its Morpheus programme.

Overview
General Dynamics UK Limited comprises two business units: General Dynamics Land Systems - UK and General Dynamics Mission Systems - UK.

Locations
General Dynamics UK has eight sites in a total of six locations in the United Kingdom:
 Bristol
 Chippenham
 Hastings (Churchfields and Castleham)
 Merthyr Tydfil
 Oakdale
 Rotherham

Products
 General Dynamics Ajax
 Ocelot
 Bowman
 Evolve to Open (EvO)
 Avionics for Tornado GR1, Harrier GR7, Nimrod MR2, Eurofighter Typhoon, AgustaWestland AW101 Mk3 and Mk4, AgustaWestland AW159 Wildcat

References

External links
 General Dynamics UK website

Aerospace companies of the United Kingdom
British subsidiaries of foreign companies
Manufacturing companies established in 1962
Defence companies of the United Kingdom
Electronics companies of the United Kingdom
Manufacturing companies of the United Kingdom
1962 establishments in England